Walker Bay Nature Reserve is a nature reserve made up of five areas located on the coast between Hermanus and Cape Agulhas, in the Overberg region in the Western Cape province of South Africa. It is administered by CapeNature.

External links
 
 
 

Provincial nature reserves of the Western Cape